Ghowgha, Ghawgha, or Qowqa may refer to:
Ghawgha Taban, Afghan singer
Ghogha (rapper), Iranian singer

See also 
 Ghogha, a town in India